The Cathedral of Our Lady of Fatima (Russian: Собор Пресвятой Девы Марии Фатимской) is a Catholic cathedral in neo-Gothic style. It is the seat of the Diocese of Karaganda,  Kazakhstan. It was built between 2003 and 2012, and was consecrated by Cardinal Angelo Sodano on September 9, 2012.

It was in 2003 that Bishop Lenga, Apostolic Administrator of Karaganda, obtained permission from the authorities to acquire land for the construction of a new cathedral. The old cathedral of St. Joseph remained small. The work was financed by donations from abroad to honor victims of the persecutions of the communist regime that sent many priests and lay Catholics to the correctional complex "Karlag". Carried out under the neo-Gothic style, it was built according to Vladimir Sergeyev's plans. Bishop Schneider actively participated in the search for funding from Germany.

See also
Cathedral of Our Lady of Fatima, Cairo
Cathedral Of Our Lady Of Fatima, Maputo
Catholic Church in Kazakhstan

References

Roman Catholic cathedrals in Kazakhstan
Roman Catholic churches in Kazakhstan
Karaganda
Cathedral
Roman Catholic churches completed in 2012